Kristie Puckett-Williams (July 31, 1979) is a civil rights activist and the Smart Justice Manager for American Civil Liberties Union for North Carolina. She’s a working scholar in mass incarceration with a focus on the treatment of women in carceral facilities.

Puckett-William has actively participated and protested with Jail Support, an organization that formed in response to the George Floyd protests in Charlotte, North Carolina. Additionally she serves as the Chair of Women in Incarceration Workgroup for the State Reentry Council Collaborative.

History 
Puckett-Williams was born in Charlotte and is the youngest of three, to a White father and Black mother. The couple married shortly  after the United States Supreme Courts ruled that laws banning interracial marriage violate the Equal Protection and Due Process Clauses of the Fourteenth Amendment to the U.S. Constitution.

Her family moved to Charlotte from South Carolina because they were told where they were located could not sustain their relationship. Puckett-Williams said despite being biracial her mother raised her and her brothers as African-American.

Domestic violence and arrests 
When Puckett-Williams was 21 she started a relationship that would eventually become physically and mentally abusive. She says this relationship lasted throughout her twenties. Because she couldn’t cope with the trauma from the abuse she started having a drug addiction with cocaine.

To support her drug habit, she began engaging in illegal activity such as credit card fraud, creating fake identification cards, and selling drugs. Puckett-Williams said the first time she was arrested was because of domestic violence even though she was a victim.

Puckett-Williams was seriously injured on multiple occasions but did not seek assistance from law-enforcement due to her previous experiences. In 2009 Puckett-Williams was charged for trafficking cocaine because of the amount found at her home, 28 grams. She was arrested and her bond was set at $167,000.

Because she couldn’t afford her bond and didn’t want to give birth to her twins in jail, she pleaded guilty. After staying in jail for five months, she agreed to a plea that required lengthy probation, treatment and drug court.

After her bond was lowered her parents paid for her to be released.

When she was sentenced, one of the officers arrested her several times prior. She didn’t recognize him but the officer remembered her. He told the judge, her public defender and district attorney that she needed help, and should not be incarcerated. The officer advocated that Puckett-Williams should be treated for substance abuse and have long-term support. She was then entered in a 10-month program that included substance abuse treatment, life skills training, parenting classes and trauma-focused care.

She said because she was treated with compassion in this program she wanted to receive a higher education. She received her Associates, Bachelors and Masters degree in Human Services Counseling

Activism 
Because of her experiences, Puckett-Williams Williams is an advocate and activist against domestic-violence. Additionally she’s an activist for police reform, racial injustice, defunding police and jail reform.

Her goal is to use her life experiences to convey her message of recovery, restoration and redemption.

Puckett-Williams was actively protesting during the George Floyd protests. She, along with 100 other activists were arrested. She said she didn’t plan on attending the protests, but when she heard that there was a march was occurring on Beatties Ford Road, and tensions were escalating between police and protesters, she wanted to join the protestors to act as mediator.

References 

Living people
1979 births
American civil rights activists